Dordt may refer to:

 Dordt University, a college in Sioux Center, Iowa, United States
 Dordrecht, a city and municipality in the western Netherlands
FC Dordt, a football club from the city of Dordrecht
 Synod of Dordt, church council held in Dordrecht in 1618–1619

See also
 Dord (disambiguation)
 Dort (disambiguation)